Wishford railway station is a former station in Great Wishford, Wiltshire, England, on the GWR's Warminster–Salisbury line.

The single-platform station at opened on 30 June 1856, on the left of trains travelling towards Salisbury. The line was doubled in 1901 and a second platform, reached by a footbridge, was then provided. The station was closed entirely on 19 September 1955 but the station master's house remains as a private residence.

References

 

Disused railway stations in Wiltshire
Former Great Western Railway stations
Railway stations in Great Britain opened in 1856
Railway stations in Great Britain closed in 1955